Francisco José Borja Cevallos (June 22, 1949– ) is an Ecuadorian government minister and diplomat. 

He was appointed Ecuador's ambassador to the United States in 2015, succeeding Nathalie Cely. He was succeeded by Francisco Carrión in 2018.

Prior to his diplomatic career, he worked as a journalist and editor. He was also an adviser to President Rodrigo Borja Cevallos.

He was a Minister of Culture and Heritage from September 2014 to March 2015, after serving as Ambassador to Chile since June 2007.

See also
Ecuador–United States relations
Embassy of Ecuador in Washington, D.C.
List of diplomatic missions of Ecuador

References

External links
NEW ECUADORIAN AMBASSADOR TO THE UNITED STATES ARRIVES IN WASHINGTON, D.C.
August 7, 2015, Letter to The New York Times

1949 births
Living people
Ambassadors of Ecuador to the United States
Ambassadors of Ecuador to Chile